Karan may refer to:

People 
 Karan (given name), an Indian given name
 Karan (caste), an Indian caste
 Karan Kayastha, a community of Kayastha in Bihar, India
 Karan (surname)

Places 
 Karan, Iran (disambiguation), a name for various villages in Iran
 Karan, Mali, a town in Mali
 Karan (Užice), a village in Serbia
 Karan District, a district in the southeastern Banaadir region of Somalia

See also 
 Karen (disambiguation)
 Karna, a character in the Mahābhārata